Brett O'Farrell (born 23 March 1980) is an Australian former professional rugby league footballer who played in the 1990s and 2000s. He played for the Melbourne Storm in the National Rugby League (NRL) from 1999 to 2001.

Early life
Played junior rugby league with Collegians Dragons before moving to the Warwick Cowboys, representing Queensland schoolboys at the 1997 national carnival.

Playing career
Moving to Brisbane, O'Farrell played with Norths Devils and was a member of the Devils' 1998 Queensland Cup Colts premiership. O'Farrell represented Australia in 1998 and 1999 playing for the Junior Kangaroos against the Junior Kiwis.

O'Farrell made his NRL debut for Melbourne Storm in round 14 of the 1999 NRL season, playing a total of 20 games for Melbourne.

After being released by Melbourne at the end of the 2001 NRL season, O'Farrell played reserve grade for South Sydney Rabbitohs, later playing for the Pia Donkeys before retiring.

O'Farrell then became a contact and tackle coach and worked with the Gold Coast Titans, New Zealand Warriors, Parramatta Eels, Australian Wallabies and Brisbane Lions.

References

1980 births
Living people
Australian rugby league players
Melbourne Storm players
Baroudeurs de Pia XIII players
Place of birth missing (living people)
People from Warwick, Queensland